Axinoptera anticostalis is a moth in the family Geometridae. It is found in Hong Kong, southern China, Taiwan, the Ryukyu Islands, mainland Japan, north-eastern India and Bhutan.

The length of the forewings is about 7 mm for both males and females. The ground colour of the wings is grey.

The larvae possibly feed on Glochidion species.

References

Moths described in 1999
Eupitheciini
Moths of Asia